Guinea-Bissau is a West-African country rich in biodiversity.

Fauna

Mammals

Predators 
There still is much debate about the status of many predator species in Guinea-Bissau. This is, in part, because much of the country remains unstudied, and because of the cryptic nature of many predator species. Lion, for instance, was listed as possibly extinct in Guinea-Bissau during the 2014 assessment of the lion by the IUCN Red list of threatened species. However, a picture of a lion was still recorded by a camera trap in 2016 the southeastern Boé region.

 Lion (Panthera leo)

Leopard (Panthera pardus)

African wild dog (Lycaon pictus)
African golden cat (Caracal aurata)

 Caracal (Caracal caracal)
Serval (Leptailurus serval)
Spotted hyena
African wildcat

Primates 

 Western chimpanzee (Pan troglodytes verus)

Herbivores 

 Red river hog
 Warthog

Birds

Blue-headed wood-dove
Iris glossy-starling

Reptiles
Bitis rhinoceros

Marine life
The tropical marine environment of Guinea-Bissau is reported to have a high diversity of sea life, notably in and around the Bijagós Archipelago.  Fishes include the African butter catfish, Malapterurus occidentalis, Parablennius sierraensis (combtooth blenny), five Synodontis catfish species including annectens, ansorgii, nigrita, schall and waterloti, the Three-banded butterflyfish and Trachinus pellegrini. Turtles are also dominant especially the West African mud turtle.

Flora
 Flora of Guinea-Bissau

See also
 João Vieira and Poilão Marine National Park

References

External links

Biota of Guinea-Bissau
Guinea-Bissau